Hondura de Huebra is a small village in the Barbalos municipality of Salamanca, Spain.

Populated places in the Province of Salamanca